Kitangiri is an administrative ward in Ilemela District, Mwanza Region, Tanzania. In 2002, the ward had a total population of 14,282 according to the national Census of 2002 this was before split from Nyamagana District on 1 October 2012 as Ilemela becomes a District Council where given total of 20 wards. In 2016 the Tanzania National Bureau of Statistics report there were 23,432 people in the ward, from 20,802 in 2012.

Villages 
The ward has 8 villages.

 Jiwe Kuu
 Kitangiri Kati
 Kitangiri A
 Kitangiri B
 Medical Research
 Mihama
 Kileleni
 Mwinuko

References

Wards of Mwanza Region
Ilemela District
Constituencies of Tanzania